Lamport may refer to:

Places
 Lamport, Buckinghamshire, England, a former hamlet
 Lamport, Northamptonshire, England, a village and civil parish

Other uses
 Lamport (surname)
 Lamport Hall, Lamport, Northamptonshire, a Grade I Listed House
 Lamport railway station, Northamptonshire
 Lamport Stadium, an arena in Toronto, Canada

See also
 Lamport and Holt, a defunct UK merchant shipping line
 Lampart (disambiguation)